The Awakening of Ruth is a 1917 American silent drama film directed by Edward H. Griffith and starring Shirley Mason, George J. Forth and Donald Hall.

Cast
 Shirley Mason as Ruth Hoagland
 George J. Forth as Bob Winthrop
 Joseph Burke as Reuben Hoagland
 William T. Hayes as Reverend Josiah Arbuthnot 
 Donald Hall as Dr. William Strong
 Sally Crute as Fay Harrington
 Jessie Stevens as Mrs. Greer
 Edward Elkas as Joseph Ulrich
 David Davies as Henri Ressori
 Carolyn Lee as Rosaline Fothergill

Plot
Ruth Hoagland lives on an island near   Massachusetts, with only her father for company. Her father, Reuben, is a fisherman who spends his time searching for buried treasure. One day, Ruth meets a yachtsman named Bob Winthrop, who is vacationing on the island. Bob and Ruth fall in love, but Bob has to return to his home in New York. After a year, Bob has forgotten Ruth. Then, Ruth finds two chests in a cave. She also finds her father, unconscious from a fall from a cliff. Ruth goes to Massachusetts for help, finding Reverend Josiah Arbuthnot and  Dr. William Strong. Upon their return, they find Ruth's father dead. Dr. Strong offers to marry Ruth, but she refuses, still waiting for Bob's return. She divides the chests with Dr. Strong and Reverend Arbuthnot. Dr. Strong, after discovering that the chests only have damp gunpowder, withdraws his savings. He gives the money to Ruth, telling her he got it from selling the items in the chests. He tells her to go to New York and develop her voice. After learning that Bob moved on, Ruth goes back to the island to get ready for Broadway. While back on the island, Ruth discovers the sacrifice Dr. Strong made.

References

Bibliography
 Matheson, Sue. The John Ford Encyclopedia. Rowman & Littlefield, 2019.

External links
 

1917 films
1917 drama films
1910s English-language films
American silent feature films
Silent American drama films
American black-and-white films
Films directed by Edward H. Griffith
Edison Studios films
1910s American films